Oroluk waas one of the administrative divisions of Pohnpei State, Federated States of Micronesia. In 1985, it became part of Sokehs Municipality.

Description
Oroluk municipality included Oroluk Atoll and Minto Reef.

This municipality is uninhabited, after a population of 6 was counted in the 1980 census. Minto Reef, the northwesternmost limit of Pohnpei State, uninhabited and has only a small sand bank, no vegetated island.

See also
 Madolenihmw
 Kitti (municipality)
 U, Pohnpei
 Nett
 Kapingamarangi
 Pingelap
 Sapwuahfik
 Nukuoro
 Mokil
 Kolonia
 Sokehs
 Palikir

References

External links
Trust Territory of the Pacific Islands - General Population Characteristics, 1980

 POHNPEI (Islas Carolinas orientales). 3º parte. Ngatik and Oroluk (Spanish)

Municipalities of Pohnpei

it:Oroluk